Felipe "Felipin" Machado Silva (born 30 October 1998) is a Brazilian professional basketball player with Flamengo in the NBB.

References

1998 births
Living people
Brazilian men's basketball players
Flamengo basketball players
Small forwards
Basketball players from Rio de Janeiro (city)